Vila Clarice is a train station on CPTM Line 7-Ruby, located in the district of Pirituba in São Paulo.

History
The allotment of Vila Clarisse was already in São Paulo maps in 1930, as in 1943 the core was already under settlement. Between the 1940s and the beginning of the 1950s, a platform was built, with occasional train stops. In 1953, City Councillor Anna Lamberga Zeglio requested to the Director of Estrada de Ferro Santos-Jundiaí that the commuter trains made regular stop in the station. With the growing of Vila Clarrise neighbourhoo, EFSJ implemented a station to replace the platform, opened on 1 September 1955.

After being operated by RFFSA between 1957 and 1983, Vila Clarice is transferred to CBTU in 1984, which enlarged the station platforms from 6 to 9 cars in 1985.

On 1 June 1994, the station was transferred to CPTM. Besides it wasn't affected by the 1983 riots, Vila Clarice was severely depredated along with other 5 stations of the CPTM Northwest Line during the 1996 riots. Because of it, the station and the line were closed for 6 months for repairs.

The gaps are center of many passengers complaints. Besides CPTM develops many projects to reduce the gaps, none of them were implanted.

Projects

CPTM
CPTM made two biddings for a project of platform structural recovery and station functional readjustment. Besides small works were executed, the main ones (construction of a new building and platform coverage) weren't.

Metro
During São Paulo campaign for Expo 2020, a new Exhibition Centre was projected to receive the exposition in the region of Pirituba/Vila Clarisse. To attend the visitors, Metro project the expansion of Line 6-Orange from Brasilândia to Bandeirantes, connection with CPTM Line 7 in Vila Clarice. With São Paulo's defeat, the project was cancelled.

However, in the 2019 Metro Report, the expansion of Line 6 appeared as one of the plans of the company.

Toponymy
The station was named after the allotment launched in 1943 in the region. Besides the neighbourhood is named Vila Clarisse, the new station was named Vila Clarice, what was kept until nowadays.

References

Companhia Paulista de Trens Metropolitanos stations
Railway stations opened in 1955